Mark Whatley (born 11 July 1990) is a Scottish professional footballer who plays as a midfielder for Montrose. Whatley has previously played for Raith Rovers, Tayport, Spartans and Arbroath.

Career 
On 20 November 2009, Whatley moved on loan to Tayport from Raith Rovers. 

In July 2014, Whatley joined Arbroath and made his debut on 26 July against Alloa Athletic in a 4-1 home loss in the Scottish League Challenge Cup. During his debut season, Whatley made 45 appearances and scored 1 goal. In February 2015, Whatley had a trial spell with Aberdeen. In the 2016–17 season, Whatley helped Arbroath get promoted to the Scottish League One and was announced captain.

Whatley left Arbroath and signed for Montrose in May 2021.

Statistics

References 

1990 births
Living people
Scottish footballers
Arbroath F.C. players
Scottish Professional Football League players
Association football midfielders
Raith Rovers F.C. players
Tayport F.C. players
Montrose F.C. players